Marie-Claire de Fleix née de Bauffremont (1618–1680) was a French courtier. She served as Première dame d'honneur to the queen dowager of France, Anne of Austria, from 1643 until 1666. 

She was the daughter of Henri de Bauffremont, marquise de Senecey, and Marie-Catherine de Senecey, and married to Jean Baptiste Gaston de Foix, comte de Fleix (1617–1646), in 1637. Her mother was a favorite of queen Anne who had been banished from court by Cardinal Richelieu, and when queen Anne became regent in 1643, she appointed Marie-Catherine de Senecey royal governess and her daughter to the office of Première dame d'honneur. 

By the request of her mother, she inherited the title duchess de Randan after her. She also inherited the title marquise de Sennecey after her childless brother in 1641.

References 
 Jean-Baptiste-Pierre Courcelles,   HISTOIRE GÉNÉALOGIQUE ET HÉRALDIQUE DES PAIRS DE FRANCE, DES GRANDS
 François-Alexandre Aubert de La Chesnaye-Desbois,Badier, Dictionnaire de la noblesse, contenant les généalogies, l'histoire ..., Volym 8
 Kleinman, Ruth: Anne of Austria. Queen of France. . Ohio State University Press (1985)

1618 births
1680 deaths
17th-century French women
French ladies-in-waiting
Household of Anne of Austria